We Are Who We Are is a 2020 coming-of-age drama television miniseries co-created and directed by Luca Guadagnino for HBO and Sky Atlantic. A coming-of-age story set on a fictional U.S. military base in Chioggia, Italy in 2016, the series follows two American 14-year-old teenage kids, Fraser Wilson and Caitlin "Harper" Poythress. The cast includes Chloë Sevigny, Jack Dylan Grazer, Alice Braga, Jordan Kristine Seamón, Spence Moore II, and Scott Mescudi.

The series premiered on September 14, 2020, on HBO in the United States and on October 9, 2020, on Sky Atlantic in Italy.

Premise
We Are Who We Are focuses on two American 14-year-old teenagers who live on a fictional U.S. military base in Chioggia, Italy in 2016. The series explores friendship, first love, identity, and immerses the audience in all the messy exhilaration and anguish of being a teenager — a story which could happen anywhere in the world, but in this case, happens in this little slice of America in Italy.

Cast and characters

Main
 Chloë Sevigny as Sarah Wilson, a colonel in the United States Army and Fraser's mother
 Jack Dylan Grazer as Fraser Wilson, a 14-year-old teenage boy who moves from New York City to a military base in Chioggia, Italy with his mothers
 Alice Braga as Maggie Teixeira, a major in the U.S. Army, Fraser's mother and Sarah's wife
 Jordan Kristine Seamón as Caitlin Poythress / Harper, a seemingly bold and confident 14-year-old teenage girl who is struggling with her gender identity
 Spence Moore II as Danny Poythress, Caitlin's older brother
 Scott Mescudi as Richard Poythress, a lieutenant colonel in the U.S. Army, Caitlin's and Danny's father
 Faith Alabi as Jenny Poythress, Caitlin's and Danny's mother
 Francesca Scorsese as Britney Orton, an outspoken, witty, sexually uninhibited girl
 Ben Taylor as Sam Pratchett, Caitlin's possessive boyfriend, and Craig's younger brother
 Corey Knight as Craig Pratchett, a soldier in his twenties, cheerful and good-natured, who is also Sam’s older brother
 Tom Mercier as Jonathan Kritchevsky, a major who works closely with Sarah
Featured
 Blood Orange as himself

Recurring
 Beatrice Barichella as Valentina, Craig's nineteen-year-old girlfriend
 Sebastiano Pigazzi as Enrico, a playful eighteen-year-old boy from Veneto, who has a weak spot for Britney
 Vittoria Bottin as Sole, a friend of the group
 Nicole Celpan as Giulia, a girl interested in Harper
 Maria Teresa Cerantola as Teresa, a bar proprietor who secretly buys fuel from Richard

Guests
 Hans Bush as Colonel McAunty, the exiting base commander who is replaced by Sarah
 Jim Sweatman as Colonel Martin
 Tomeka Campbell Turley as Mel
 Gaia Schiralli as Monica
 Lisa Lazzaro as Loredana
 Brixhilda Shqalsi as Marta, Jonathan's girlfriend
 Giulia Manzini as Anna
 Jacopo Brigotti as Angelo
 Arturo Gabbriellini as Luca, Fraser’s love interest whom he meets while on their way to the Blood Orange concert in Bologna
 Emma Segat as Futura, a bartender that Harper meets at the Blood Orange concert

Episodes

Production

Development
In February 2019, it was announced that Luca Guadagnino was in talks with HBO to work on a new one-hour, eight-episode show tentatively titled We Are Who We Are. Guadagnino would direct the series and write the script with Paolo Giordano and Francesca Manieri. Lorenzo Mieli and Riccardo Neri were named as prospective executive producers.

The US Department of Defense was initially supportive, and the show was to be filmed at the US army complex at Vicenza, which would also provide the extras. Guadagnino later commented that they must not have read the script; the Department of Defense later withdrew all offers of support and, according to Guadagnino, would have preferred the show not to happen. Ultimately HBO had a set built nearby to represent the base.

The set was recreated in an ex Italian Air Force base that served as the logistics area of a Nike Hercules missiles site in Bagnoli di Sopra (PD), the "80° Gruppo I.T.".

The first reports described the main characters, Fraser Wilson and Caitlin Harper, as "a detached teenager who hails from New York City" and "a character [that] is hard to describe—beautiful, sometimes disapproving, poetic," respectively.

Casting
On July 17, 2019, the cast was revealed by HBO and it includes Chloë Sevigny, Scott Mescudi, Alice Braga, Jack Dylan Grazer, Spence Moore II, and newcomers Jordan Kristine Seamón, Faith Alabi, Corey Knight, Tom Mercier, Francesca Scorsese, Ben Taylor and Sebastiano Pigazzi.

Filming
Principal photography on the series was expected to begin in Italy in late May 2019, with production set to run through October, but production began in late July.

Release
The series premiered in its entirety at the 68th San Sebastián International Film Festival on September 20, 2020.

The series premiered on television on September 14, 2020, on HBO in the United States and on October 9, 2020, on Sky Atlantic in Italy. The finale aired in Italy on October 30, 2020, ahead of its broadcast on HBO. In the United Kingdom, the limited series was released in its entirety on November 22, 2020, by BBC Three via iPlayer.

Reception

Critical response
Review aggregator Rotten Tomatoes reported an approval rating of 90% based on 39 reviews, with an average rating of 7.90/10. The website's critics consensus reads, "We Are Who We Are doesn't move mountains, but by focusing on the little details and allowing its central teens to just be, Luca Guadagnino creates small-screen poetry." Metacritic gave the series a weighted average score of 77 out of 100 based on 22 reviews, indicating "generally favorable reviews".

Darren Franich of Entertainment Weekly gave the series a B+ and said, "Despite some flat characters, Guadagnino exuberantly spotlights his cast of up-and-comers, especially Corey Knight." Writing for Rolling Stone, Alan Sepinwall gave a rating of 4/5 and wrote "Few transplants from the big screen to the small have as keen an eye, or ear, as Guadagnino, so the voyeuristic nature of the storytelling feels inviting rather than indulgent. (Mostly)." Caroline Framke of Variety described the series as "so visceral as to become unsettling—but what else is being a teenager like, if not immersive, visceral and unsettling?". Matt Roush of TVInsider and TV Guide stated that the series wants to be "shocking" like Euphoria, "but soon grows monotonous."

U.S. Ratings

Notes

References

External links

2020 American television series debuts
2020 American television series endings
2020 Italian television series debuts
2020 Italian television series endings
2020s American drama television miniseries
2020s American LGBT-related drama television series
2020s Italian television miniseries
English-language television shows
HBO original programming
Sky Atlantic (Italy) television programmes
Television series about teenagers
Television series set in 2016
Television shows set in Italy
Television series by Fremantle (company)
2020s Italian drama television series
Bisexuality-related television series
Male bisexuality in fiction